The Mim Kut is a festival of the  Zo People, of India and Burma. It is usually celebrated during the months of August and September, on account of  first the harvest of maize, job's tears and millets.

Origin and History
Mim Kut is regarded as the oldest festival of the Zo People, it was a ceremony organized for the dead.  Feasting is a part of it but there is hardly any fun and gaiety in it. Mim means job's tears.  It is observed on the harvesting season of maize, job's tears and millets. It was held in memory of the deceased.

Celebration
Mim Kut is celebrated with great fanfare by (illegally) drinking rice-beer, singing, dancing, and feasting but without gaiety. Samples of the year's harvests are consecrated to the departed souls of the community. As Mim Kut is a period for lamentation, it is also known as Tah Kut, which means‘festival of reaping’

References

Festivals in Mizoram
Festivals in Nagaland
Harvest festivals in India
Folk festivals in India